Mauricio Alberto Ardila Cano (born May 12, 1979, in Medellín) is a Colombian former professional road bicycle racer.

Major results 

1999
1st Stage 11 Vuelta a Guatemala
2002
1st Stage 4 Tour of Sweden
1st Stage 10 Tour de l'Avenir
2003
4th Subida a Urkiola
2004
1st  Overall Tour of Britain
1st Stages 2 & 4
2nd Overall Rheinland-Pfalz Rundfahrt
5th Subida a Urkiola
7th Circuito de Getxo
8th Overall Vuelta a Burgos
2005
1st Stage 5 Niedersachsen-Rundfahrt
9th Overall Vuelta a España
2006
6th Road race, National Road Championships
2008
3rd Rund um den Henninger Turm
2011
10th Klasika Primavera
10th GP Llodio
2012
2nd Overall Vuelta a Bolivia
1st Stage 3 (TTT)
2014
National Road Championships
8th Time trial
10th Road race

References

External links 
Profile at official website

1979 births
Living people
Colombian male cyclists
Sportspeople from Medellín
21st-century Colombian people